Xenorhina arboricola is a species of frog in the family Microhylidae.
It is endemic to Papua New Guinea.
Its natural habitats are subtropical or tropical moist lowland forests and subtropical or tropical moist montane forests.

References

Xenorhina
Amphibians of Papua New Guinea
Taxonomy articles created by Polbot
Amphibians described in 2000